Trenggalek Regency is a regency (kabupaten) in East Java, Indonesia. 

This regency has an area of 1,261.40 km2 and had a population of 674,411 residents at the 2010 Census and 731,125 at the 2020 Census. It is located on the southern shore of East Java and is surrounded by three regencies: Ponorogo to the northwest; Pacitan to the southwest; and Tulungagung to the east. The administrative centre is located in the district (kecamatan) of Trenggalek.

 Geography 
Trenggalek is a regency that is located on the southern shore of Java island and has the following geographical boundaries:
 To the northwest: Ponorogo;
 To the southwest: Pacitan;
 To the east: Tulungagung;
 To the south: Indian Ocean, and
 To the north: Mount Wilis.

 Administrative districts 
The Regency is divided into fourteen districts (kecamatan), tabulated below with their areas and their population totals from the 2010 Census and the 2020 Census. The table also includes the location of the district headquarters, the number of administrative villages (rural desa and urban kelurahan) in each district, and its postal codes.

Notes: (a) including 11 small offshore islands. (a) including 23 small offshore islands. (a) including 23 small offshore islands. (d) except for the village of Banaran, which has a post code of 66318.

Commodities

Agricultural produce in the area includes rice, corns, cassava, soya beans, legumes. Plantations produce sugar cane, cloves, durians, salak, mangosteens, and rambutans. Industrial outputs include: soy sauce, syrup, tapioca, anchovies, batik, snacks, cigarettes, sawmill, building materials, roofs, and tofu.

Tourism and cultural sights
Trenggalek has several tourist sites, including beaches (Pantai), caves, and mountain ranges.Gallery of Trenggalek tourism objects. Trenggalek Tourism: Cool, calm, and beautiful place.  

Gua Lowo is a cave with examples of stalactites and stalagmites. Based on a cave expert, Mr. Gilbert Manthovani and Dr. Robert K. Kho in 1984, it was declared that Guo Lowo is the biggest natural cave in Southeast Asia with approximately 800  meters of length, nine main rooms, and some small rooms. Guo Lowo literally means "bat cave", owing to the many bats living here when it was first discovered.
 Pantai Prigi. This beach is known for its rock formations. There is also a fish market and a harbor.
 Pantai Pasir Putih. Literally means "white sand beach" and is located adjacent to the Prigi beach.
 Pantai Pelang. This beach has a waterfall and some tiny islands.
 Larung Sembonyo. This traditional ceremony is held annually.
 Pemandian Tapan. This bathing place is located in Karangan and the natural water source comes directly from the mountain ranges.
 Upacara Dam Bagong. Bull's head is swept away in Kali Bagong (Bagong river) in this annually-held ceremony.
 Candi Brongkah. It is a temple which tells the history of Trenggalek.
 Alun-alun Kota. It is the central park in the middle of the city. It also has a playground and snack vendors nearby.
 Tri Turonggo Yakso''. It is a typical traditional dance of Trenggalek. The dance belongs to the traditional dance called "jaranan" which is also founding another region. Turonggo Yakso symbolizes the victory of villages in driving away from the devil.

Gallery

See also

 List of regencies and cities of Indonesia

References

Regencies of East Java